The 1987 Detroit Lions season was the 58th season in franchise history. In a strike-affected season, the Lions fell further from their 1986 record of 5–11, winning only four games and missing the postseason for the fourth consecutive season.

Offseason

NFL draft

Personnel

Staff

NFL replacement players
After the league decided to use replacement players during the NFLPA strike, the following team was assembled:

Roster

Regular season

Schedule

Standings

References

External links
 1987 Detroit Lions at Pro-Football-Reference.com

Detroit Lions
Detroit Lions seasons
Detroit Lions